İsfendiyar Bey (full name: İzzettin İsfendiyar) was the Bey (ruler) of Candaroğlu Beylik an Anatolian beylik between 1385 and 1440 (Anatolia is the Asiatic part of Turkey). Although the name of the dynasty is Candar, Ottoman Empire historians called the beylik İsfendiyaroğlu because of İsfendiyar's long reign.

His father was Kötürüm Bayazıt of the Candar dynasty and his mother was Sultan Hatun, the daughter of Süleyman Pasha and the granddaughter of Orhan, the second bey of the Ottomans. His daughter Sultan Hatun was married firstly to Sultan Murad II and after Murad's death to Ishak Pasha, one of Murad II officials.

Early years
Before he was enthroned, his beylik had been reduced to a small area around Sinop, a port on Black Sea coast. Afraid to lose this last part, İsfendiyar followed a peaceful policy with the neighbors. During the reign of the Ottoman sultan Bayezit I (1389-1402) who conquered most of the other beyliks, İsfendiyar was able to establish good relations with the Ottomans. Probably, the emergence of Kadı Burhaneddin’s short lived but powerful Turkmen state in the Central Anatolia was the main reason for the Ottoman-Candar cooperation  But several beys whose territory was annexed by the Ottomans took refuge in his beylik.

Expansion
During Timur's campaign to Anatolia (1402) he annexed the former territory of his beylik with Timur's approval. During the Ottoman Interregnum (1402-1413) he followed a balanced policy between the contestants.  During the reign of Mehmed I of the Ottoman Empire (1413-1421) he tried to be an ally of the Ottomans.

Kasım’s revolt and the last years
However, in 1416, his son Kasım revolted with Ottoman support. İsfendiyar Bey had to abandon the territory to the south of Ilgaz Mountains (i.e., Çankırı). In 1419 Ottomans further annexed the eastern part of the beylik (i.e., Samsun) 
Death of Mehmed I and the two revolts during the early years of the new sultan Murat II,  gave İsfendiyar Bey a chance to regain the loses. However, after Murat II restored order at home, he quickly defeated İsfendiyar. According to the treaty signed in 1423 (or 1424) İsfendiyar abandoned his gains, but kept Sinop and Kastamonu.

In later years İsfendiyar established family relationships with the Ottomans. He died on 26 February 1440 in Sinop. He was succeeded by İbrahim II.

Family
Mother
Sultan Hatun (died 1395, buried in Aynalı Kadın Mausoleum, Sinop), daughter of Süleyman Pasha, son of Sultan Orhan;

Consort
Esen Kutlu Hatun also known as Tatlu Hatun (died 3 July 1445, buried in Isfendiyarid Royal Mausoleum, Sinop), mother of Ibrahim Bey;

Children
Taceddin Ibrahim II Bey, next ruler of Candaroğlu Beylik between 1440 and 1443, married to Selçuk Hatun (died 1485, buried in Yeşil Mausoleum, Bursa), daughter of Sultan Mehmed I;
Kıvameddin Kasım Bey, married to Sultan Hatun, daughter of Sultan Mehmed I;
Hızır Bey;
Murad Bey;
Sultan Hatun, married firstly to Sultan Murad II, married secondly to Ishak Pasha, one of Murad and his son Mehmed's officials, governor of Anatolia;
Saidbaht Hatun (died 1459, buried in Isfendiyarid Royal Mausoleum, Sinop),

References

1440 deaths
Isfendiyarids
History of Sinop Province
Turkic rulers
Year of birth unknown
Anatolian beyliks
14th-century monarchs in Asia
15th-century monarchs in Asia